Cho Jin-soo (Hangul : 조진수; Hanja: 趙珍洙; born September 2, 1983) is a South Korean football player who plays for Suwon FC in K. League.

His previous club is Jeonbuk Hyundai Motors, Jeju United and Ulsan Hyundai in the K-League.

On 2008 January 30, he played first A match against Chile in Seoul.

External links 

1983 births
Living people
Association football forwards
South Korean footballers
South Korean expatriate footballers
Expatriate footballers in Thailand
South Korea international footballers
Jeonbuk Hyundai Motors players
Jeju United FC players
Ulsan Hyundai FC players
Cho Jin-soo
Suwon FC players
K League 1 players
K League 2 players
Cho Jin-soo
K3 League players
Konkuk University alumni